Alloway Township is a township in Salem County, New Jersey, United States. As of the 2010 United States Census, the township's population was 3,467, reflecting an increase of 693 (+25.0%) from the 2,774 counted in the 2000 Census, which had in turn declined by 21 (−0.8%) from the 2,795 counted in the 1990 Census.	
What is now Alloway was formally incorporated as Upper Alloways Creek Township by a Royal charter granted on June 17, 1767, from portions of the now-defunct Alloways Creek Township. The township was formally incorporated by an act of the New Jersey Legislature on February 21, 1798. Quinton Township was formed from portions of the township on February 18, 1873. The name was officially changed to Alloway Township as of February 21, 1884.

The name Alloway is derivative of Allowas, a local Native American chief.

Geography

According to the United States Census Bureau, the township had a total area of 33.91 square miles (87.84 km2), including 33.48 square miles (86.70 km2) of land and 0.44 square miles (1.13 km2) of water (1.29%).

Alloway (with a 2010 Census population of 1,402) is an unincorporated community and census-designated place (CDP) located within Alloway Township. Other unincorporated communities, localities and place names located partially or completely within the township include Aldine, Alloway Junction, Dilkes Mile, Friesburg, Lake Sycamore, Mower, New Boston, Oakland, Penton, Remsterville, Riddleton and Watsons Mills.

The township borders Mannington Township, Pilesgrove Township, Quinton Township and Upper Pittsgrove Township in Salem County; and Hopewell Township, Stow Creek Township and Upper Deerfield Township in Cumberland County.

Demographics

Census 2010

The Census Bureau's 2006–2010 American Community Survey showed that (in 2010 inflation-adjusted dollars) median household income was $86,979 (with a margin of error of +/− $8,158) and the median family income was $91,979 (+/− $8,633). Males had a median income of $61,544 (+/− $11,567) versus $35,528 (+/− $2,497) for females. The per capita income for the borough was $27,649 (+/− $2,963). About 4.6% of families and 5.6% of the population were below the poverty line, including 3.9% of those under age 18 and 19.1% of those age 65 or over.

Census 2000

As of the 2000 United States Census there were 2,774 people, 948 households, and 742 families residing in the township. The racial makeup of the township was 90.70% White, 6.89% African American, 0.54% Native American, 0.43% Asian, 0.40% from other races, and 1.05% from two or more races. Hispanic or Latino of any race were 2.38% of the population.

There were 948 households, out of which 36.0% had children under the age of 18 living with them, 66.8% were married couples living together, 7.0% had a female householder with no husband present, and 21.7% were non-families. 18.7% of all households were made up of individuals, and 8.2% had someone living alone who was 65 years of age or older. The average household size was 2.80 and the average family size was 3.19.

In the township the population was spread out, with 28.1% under the age of 18, 6.8% from 18 to 24, 29.0% from 25 to 44, 23.8% from 45 to 64, and 12.4% who were 65 years of age or older. The median age was 37 years. For every 100 females, there were 103.5 males. For every 100 females age 18 and over, there were 105.0 males.

The median income for a household in the township was $56,528, and the median income for a family was $65,132. Males had a median income of $43,839 versus $27,188 for females. The per capita income for the township was $22,935. About 4.5% of families and 8.2% of the population were below the poverty line, including 8.1% of those under age 18 and 4.6% of those age 65 or over.

Government

Local government
Alloway is governed under the township form of New Jersey municipal government. The township is one of 141 municipalities (of the 564) statewide that use this form of government. The Township Committee is comprised of three members, who are elected directly by the voters at-large in partisan elections to serve three-year terms of office on a staggered basis, with one seat coming up for election each year as part of the November general election. At an annual reorganization meeting, the council selects one of its members to serves as mayor and another as deputy mayor.

, the Alloway Township Committee consists of Mayor P. Ed McKelvey (R, term on committee ends December 31, 2024; term as mayor ends 2023), Deputy Mayor K. Myrle Patrick (R, term on committee ends 2022; term as deputy mayor ends 2020) and Warren Morgan III (D, 2023).

Federal, state and county representation
Alloway Township is located in the 2nd Congressional district and is part of New Jersey's 3rd state legislative district

 

Salem County is governed by a five-member Board of County Commissioners who are elected at-large to serve three-year terms of office on a staggered basis, with either one or two seats coming up for election each year. At an annual reorganization meeting held in the beginning of January, the board selects a Director and a Deputy Director from among its members. , Salem County's Commissioners (with party, residence and term-end year listed in parentheses) are 
Director Benjamin H. Laury (R, Elmer, term as commissioner ends December 31, 2024; term as director ends 2022), 
Deputy Director Gordon J. "Mickey" Ostrum, Jr. (R, Pilesgrove Township, term as commissioner ends 2024; term as deputy director ends 2022),  
R. Scott Griscom (R, Mannington Township, 2022), 
Edward A. Ramsay (R, Pittsgrove Township, 2023) and
Lee R. Ware (D, Elsinboro Township, 2022). Constitutional officers elected on a countywide basis are 
County Clerk Dale A. Cross (R, 2024),
Sheriff Charles M. Miller (R, 2024) and 
Surrogate Nicki A. Burke (D, 2023).

Politics
As of March 23, 2011, there were a total of 2,269 registered voters in Alloway Township, of which 509 (22.4% vs. 30.6% countywide) were registered as Democrats, 596 (26.3% vs. 21.0%) were registered as Republicans and 1,163 (51.3% vs. 48.4%) were registered as Unaffiliated. There was one voter registered to another party. Among the township's 2010 Census population, 65.4% (vs. 64.6% in Salem County) were registered to vote, including 88.7% of those ages 18 and over (vs. 84.4% countywide).

In the 2012 presidential election, Republican Mitt Romney received 58.5% of the vote (1,019 cast), ahead of Democrat Barack Obama with 39.7% (691 votes), and other candidates with 1.8% (31 votes), among the 1,754 ballots cast by the township's 2,412 registered voters (13 ballots were spoiled), for a turnout of 72.7%. In the 2008 presidential election, Republican John McCain received 1,011 votes (56.5% vs. 46.6% countywide), ahead of Democrat Barack Obama with 731 votes (40.8% vs. 50.4%) and other candidates with 32 votes (1.8% vs. 1.6%), among the 1,790 ballots cast by the township's 2,312 registered voters, for a turnout of 77.4% (vs. 71.8% in Salem County). In the 2004 presidential election, Republican George W. Bush received 1,060 votes (62.6% vs. 52.5% countywide), ahead of Democrat John Kerry with 609 votes (36.0% vs. 45.9%) and other candidates with 15 votes (0.9% vs. 1.0%), among the 1,693 ballots cast by the township's 2,172 registered voters, for a turnout of 77.9% (vs. 71.0% in the whole county).

In the 2013 gubernatorial election, Republican Chris Christie received 68.1% of the vote (770 cast), ahead of Democrat Barbara Buono with 27.8% (314 votes), and other candidates with 4.1% (46 votes), among the 1,138 ballots cast by the township's 2,397 registered voters (8 ballots were spoiled), for a turnout of 47.5%. In the 2009 gubernatorial election, Republican Chris Christie received 660 votes (55.4% vs. 46.1% countywide), ahead of Democrat Jon Corzine with 368 votes (30.9% vs. 39.9%), Independent Chris Daggett with 137 votes (11.5% vs. 9.7%) and other candidates with 17 votes (1.4% vs. 2.0%), among the 1,192 ballots cast by the township's 2,302 registered voters, yielding a 51.8% turnout (vs. 47.3% in the county).

Education

The Alloway Township School District serves students in public school for pre-kindergarten through eighth grade at Alloway Township School. As of the 2018–2019 school year, the district, comprised of one school, had an enrollment of 365 students and 28.5 classroom teachers (on an FTE basis), for a student–teacher ratio of 12.8:1.

Students in public school for ninth through twelfth grades attend Woodstown High School in Woodstown, which serves students from Pilesgrove Township and Woodstown, along with students from Alloway Township, Oldmans Township and Upper Pittsgrove Township who attend the high school as part of sending/receiving relationships with the Woodstown-Pilesgrove Regional School District. As of the 2018–2019 school year, the high school had an enrollment of 603 students and 48.6 classroom teachers (on an FTE basis), for a student–teacher ratio of 12.4:1.

Transportation

New Jersey Route 77 passes through the far eastern corner of the township. County Route 540 and County Route 581 also traverse the township.

References

External links

 Official Alloway Township Website
 Alloway Township page on Salem County website
 Official Website of the Alloway Township Halloween Parade
 Alloway Township School District
 
 Data for Alloway Township School District, National Center for Education Statistics
 Woodstown High School
 Alloway Township Youth League

 
1767 establishments in New Jersey
Populated places established in 1767
Township form of New Jersey government
Townships in Salem County, New Jersey